The Janet Smith case concerns the murder of 22-year-old nursemaid Janet Kennedy Smith in Vancouver, British Columbia, Canada, on 26 July 1924, and the ensuing suspicions of a coverup.

Background
Janet Smith was born in Perth, Scotland, on 25 June 1902 to railway fireman Arthur Mitchell Tooner Smith and Joanna Benzies. The family moved to London when she was aged 11. In January 1923, Smith obtained a position taking care of the newborn daughter of Frederick and Doreen Baker. Frederick Baker ran an import-export business. When the family moved, first to Paris in April, then in October back to Vancouver, Smith accompanied them.

The Bakers were among the social elite of Vancouver. They lived on the fashionable West Side, then moved in May 1924 into the house of Frederick's brother, Richard Plunkett Baker, at 3851 Osler in the exclusive Shaughnessy Heights neighborhood.

The Chinese houseboy, married (arrived in Canada in 1913 leaving family in Hong Kong) 25- or 27-year-old Wong Foon Sing, became infatuated with Smith, giving her presents such as a silk nightdress. Her friends would later testify that she feared him.

Death and lack of an investigation
On 26 July 1924, Point Grey Police Constable James Green was called to the house. Wong claimed he heard what sounded like a car backfire; in the basement he found Smith's body. There was a bullet wound through her temple and a .45 caliber revolver near her right hand.

Green picked up the weapon, making it impossible to obtain fingerprints from it. Despite there being no bullet, blood or brain tissue on the walls, no powder burns on her face, and the fact that the back of her head had been smashed in, Green concluded that she had committed suicide. After an inquest, the Vancouver coroner called it a "self-inflicted but accidental death."

Undertakers were summoned, and instructed by both the coroner and the police to embalm the body, likely eradicating any clues that it might have yielded, for instance whether Smith had been sexually assaulted. It was the first time the undertaker had embalmed the victim of a violent death without a postmortem. He found unexplained burns on Smith's right side. Smith was buried at Mountain View Cemetery in the 1919 section bordered by 41st Avenue and Prince Edward Street.

Reopening of the case
Smith's friends contacted the recently formed United Council of Scottish Societies, which pressured the provincial government and Attorney General Alexander Malcolm Manson to reopen the case. The Vancouver Star, a scandal sheet published by Victor Odlum, was quick to pounce on the affair. An additional inducement for Odlum was that an enemy of his, General A. D. McRae, was the father of Frederick Baker's sister-in-law.

The body was exhumed on 28 August and a second inquest held. This time the jury concluded that Smith had been murdered. Manson appointed a special prosecutor, Malcolm Bruce Jackson.

Suspicion immediately fell on Wong, the only other person in the house (other than the Bakers' baby, Rosemary) when the crime was supposedly committed.  The Star published several articles in late July and early August in which it had portrayed Wong as the likely killer.

Proposed legislation
Odlum was an "exclusionist"; he believed that Asians could not assimilate with whites and had run on an anti-Asian platform in the 1921 federal election. On 8 August, he published an editorial called "Should Chinese Work with White Girls? He called for legislation to "preserve white girls of impressionable youth from the unnecessary wiles and villainies of low caste yellow men."

Popular Member of the Legislative Assembly Mary Ellen Smith introduced the "Janet Smith Bill" in November. It would have prohibited the employing of Orientals and white women in the same household. The Vancouver Province pointed out that it violated the Anglo-Japanese Treaty of 1911 (which prohibited discriminatory legislation against Japanese) and that the British Columbia legislature did not have the authority to pass it. It failed after a second reading.

Kidnapping
Interest gradually died down, until on 20 March 1925, Wong was kidnapped by a group of men dressed in Ku Klux Klan robes. They proceeded to torture their captive for six weeks, trying to elicit a confession, but Wong refused to cooperate. On 1 May, he was released.

A scandal later developed when it was discovered that the kidnappers included "two Point Grey police commissioners, the chief of police, a detective sergeant and three prominent officials of the city's Scottish societies." The group had also enlisted the translation services of Wong Foon Sien, whose participation elicited outrage amongst both Chinese Canadians and Anglophones in the community because he was also working for a detective agency investigating the case. One man pleaded guilty to kidnapping. A detective and his son were also convicted, but the jury gave a "strong recommendation of mercy". The Point Grey policemen were acquitted, and the government controversially barred prosecution of the others.

As it turned out, Manson knew where Wong was being held, but did nothing about it, hoping that the torture would solve the case. Instead, Manson's career was severely damaged by the revelation of his inaction.

Trial
Meanwhile, Wong was put on trial for murder. In October, the case was thrown out of court due to lack of evidence. Wong went back to work for the Bakers. In 1926, he left the country for Hong Kong or China.

Other suspects
Other theories gained popularity. According to one rumour, Smith had been raped and murdered at a wild party at the Baker house by wealthy playboys, who then bribed the authorities to cover it up.

Bibliography
Starkins, Ed (1984). Who Killed Janet Smith? Gage Distribution Co.

See also

List of unsolved murders

References

1924 murders in Canada
1924 in British Columbia
July 1924 events
Burials at Mountain View Cemetery (Vancouver)
Female murder victims
Unsolved murders in Canada